Carroll County is a county in the U.S. state of New Hampshire. As of the 2020 census, the population was 50,107, making it the third-least populous county in New Hampshire. Its county seat is Ossipee. The county was created in 1840 and organized at Ossipee from towns removed from Strafford County. It was named in honor of Charles Carroll of Carrollton, who had died in 1832, the last surviving signer of the United States Declaration of Independence.

Geography
It is the third-largest county in New Hampshire by total area. Northern Carroll County is known for being mountainous. Several ski areas, including Cranmore Mountain, Attitash, King Pine, and Black Mountain, are located here. A salient along the northwestern margin of the county runs through Crawford Notch; the northern portion of the salient is within Crawford Notch State Park.

Adjacent counties
 Coos County (north)
 Oxford County, Maine (northeast)
 York County, Maine (southeast)
 Strafford County (south)
 Belknap County (southwest)
 Grafton County (west)

National protected area
 White Mountain National Forest (part)

Demographics

2000 census
As of the census of 2000, there were 43,666 people, 18,351 households, and 12,313 families living in the county.  The population density was 18/km2 (47/sq mi).  There were 34,750 housing units at an average density of 14/km2 (37/sq mi).  The racial makeup of the county was 98.22% White, 0.17% Black or African American, 0.28% Native American, 0.38% Asian, 0.01% Pacific Islander, 0.17% from other races, and 0.77% from two or more races.  0.48% of the population were Hispanic or Latino of any race. 22.5% were of English, 15.6% Irish, 10.5% American, 9.7% French, 6.7% German, 5.8% Italian and 5.2% Scottish ancestry. 96.5% spoke English and 1.6% French as their first language.

There were 18,351 households, out of which 27.40% had children under the age of 18 living with them, 55.30% were married couples living together, 7.80% had a female householder with no husband present, and 32.90% were non-families. 26.60% of all households were made up of individuals, and 11.10% had someone living alone who was 65 years of age or older.  The average household size was 2.35 and the average family size was 2.82.

In the county, the population was spread out, with 22.60% under the age of 18, 5.30% from 18 to 24, 26.50% from 25 to 44, 27.70% from 45 to 64, and 17.80% who were 65 years of age or older.  The median age was 42 years. For every 100 females there were 96.60 males.  For every 100 females age 18 and over, there were 94.20 males.

The median income for a household in the county was $39,990, and the median income for a family was $46,922. Males had a median income of $31,811 versus $23,922 for females. The per capita income for the county was $21,931.  About 5.50% of families and 7.90% of the population were below the poverty line, including 10.00% of those under age 18 and 6.70% of those age 65 or over.

2010 census
As of the 2010 United States Census, there were 47,818 people, 21,052 households, and 13,569 families living in the county. The racial makeup of the county was 97.5% white, 0.6% Asian, 0.3% American Indian, 0.3% black or African American, 0.2% from other races, and 1.1% from two or more races. Those of Hispanic or Latino origin made up 1.0% of the population. In terms of ancestry,

The largest ancestry group in Carroll County are people of English ancestry, who make up 29.3% of people in the county.  The second largest ancestry group in the county are people of Irish ancestry who make up 24.7%.  The third largest group is people of French ancestry who make up 13.8% of people in the county.

Of the 21,052 households, 24.2% had children under the age of 18 living with them, 52.2% were married couples living together, 8.1% had a female householder with no husband present, 35.5% were non-families, and 28.4% of all households were made up of individuals. The average household size was 2.25 and the average family size was 2.72. The median age was 48.3 years.

The median income for a household in the county was $49,897 and the median income for a family was $60,086. Males had a median income of $41,634 versus $32,402 for females. The per capita income for the county was $28,411. About 6.1% of families and 9.6% of the population were below the poverty line, including 14.6% of those under age 18 and 5.5% of those age 65 or over.

Politics and government
The county is historically Republican, but in 2008 Barack Obama received 52.39% of the county's vote. This made him the first Democratic presidential nominee to win the county since 1912 and the first Democratic presidential nominee to win an absolute majority in the county since 1884. Joe Biden later repeated this feat in 2020. However, despite the recent Democratic trend, the county has not voted more Democratic than the nation since 1888 in terms of two-party vote.

The county is politically divided between the more conservative southern half, home to several seasonal communities along the north shore of Lake Winnipesaukee including Moultonborough, Tuftonboro, and Wolfeboro, and the more liberal northern half, with several ski towns and resort towns such as Bartlett and Conway. In both the 2012 Presidential and gubernatorial elections in New Hampshire, Democratic candidates easily won the northern half of the county, and Republican candidates easily won the southern half of the county.

Carroll County is one of only thirteen counties to have voted for Obama in 2008, Romney in 2012, Trump in 2016, and Biden in 2020.

|}

County Commission
The executive power of Carroll County's government is held by three county commissioners, each representing one of the three commissioner districts within the county.

In addition to the County Commission, there are five directly elected officials: they include County Attorney, Register of Deeds, County Sheriff, Register of Probate, and County Treasurer.

Legislative branch
The legislative branch of Carroll County is made up of all of the members of the New Hampshire House of Representatives from the county. In total, as of January 2021 there are 15 members from 8 different districts.

Communities

Towns

 Albany
 Bartlett
 Brookfield
 Chatham
 Conway
 Eaton
 Effingham
 Freedom
 Hart's Location
 Jackson
 Madison
 Moultonborough
 Ossipee (county seat)
 Sandwich
 Tamworth
 Tuftonboro
 Wakefield
 Wolfeboro

Township
 Hale's Location

Census-designated places

 Bartlett
 Center Ossipee
 Center Sandwich
 Conway
 Melvin Village
 North Conway
 Sanbornville
 Suissevale
 Union
 Wolfeboro

Villages

 Center Conway
 Chocorua
 East Conway
 East Wakefield
 Eidelweiss
 Ferncroft
 Glen
 Intervale
 Kearsarge
 Lees Mill
 Mirror Lake
 North Sandwich
 Redstone
 Silver Lake
 South Tamworth
 West Ossipee
 Wolfeboro Falls
 Wonalancet

See also

 Bartlett and Albany Railroad
 National Register of Historic Places listings in Carroll County, New Hampshire

Notes

References

External links

 Carroll County official website
 National Register of Historic Places listing for Carroll Co., New Hampshire

 
1840 establishments in New Hampshire
Populated places established in 1840